William Wallace Halleck Reid (April 15, 1891 – January 18, 1923) was an American actor in silent film, referred to as "the screen's most perfect lover". He also had a brief career as a racing driver.

Early life 
Reid was born in St. Louis, Missouri, into a showbusiness family. His mother, Bertha Westbrook, was an actress, and his father, James Halleck "Hal" Reid, worked successfully in a variety of theatrical jobs, mainly as playwright and actor, traveling the country. As a boy Wallace Reid was performing on stage at an early age, but acting was put on hold while he obtained an education at Freehold Military School in Freehold Township, New Jersey. He later graduated from Perkiomen Seminary in Pennsburg, Pennsylvania, in 1909. A gifted all-around athlete, Reid participated in a number of sports while also following an interest in music, learning to play the piano, banjo, drums, and violin. As a teenager, he spent time in Wyoming, where he learned to be an outdoorsman.

Career 
Reid was drawn to the burgeoning motion picture industry by his father, who shifted from the theatre to writing films, directing them, and acting in them. In 1910, Reid appeared in his first film, The Phoenix, an adaptation of a Milton Nobles play, filmed at Selig Polyscope Studios in Chicago. Reid used the script from a play his father had written and approached the very successful Vitagraph Studios, hoping to be given the opportunity to direct. Instead, Vitagraph executives capitalized on his sex appeal, and in addition to having him direct, cast him in a major role. Although Reid's good looks and powerful physique made him the perfect "matinée idol", he was equally happy with roles behind the scenes and often worked as a writer, cameraman, and director.

Reid was arrested in Portland, Oregon in 1921 for violating prohibition law.

Wallace Reid appeared in several films with his father, and as his career in film flourished, he was soon acting and directing with and for early film mogul Allan Dwan. In 1913, while at Universal Pictures, Reid met and married actress Dorothy Davenport. He was featured as Jeff, the blacksmith, in The Birth of a Nation (1915) and had an uncredited role in Intolerance (1916), both directed by D. W. Griffith; he worked with leading ladies such as Florence Turner, Gloria Swanson, Lillian Gish, Elsie Ferguson, and Geraldine Farrar en route to becoming one of Hollywood's major heartthrobs.

Already involved with the creation of more than 100 motion picture shorts, Reid was signed by producer Jesse L. Lasky and starred in over 60 films for Lasky's Famous Players film company, which later became Paramount Pictures. Frequently paired with actress Ann Little, his action-hero role as the dashing race-car driver drew young girls and older women alike to theaters to see his daredevil auto thrillers such as The Roaring Road (1919), Double Speed (1920), Excuse My Dust (1920), and Too Much Speed (1921). One of his auto-racing films, Across the Continent (1922), was chosen as the opening night film for San Francisco's Castro Theatre, which opened on 22 June 1922.

Reid loved racing so much that he even made an (unsuccessful) attempt to qualify for the 1922 Indianapolis 500.

Death 

While en route to a location in Oregon during filming of The Valley of the Giants (1919), Reid was injured in a train wreck near Arcata, California and needed six stitches to close a  scalp wound. To keep on filming, he was prescribed morphine for relief of his pain and Reid soon became addicted. He continued working at a frantic pace in films that were growing more physically demanding, and changing from 15–20 minutes in duration to as much as an hour. Reid's morphine addiction worsened at a time when drug rehabilitation programs were non-existent. He died in a sanatorium while attempting to recover.

Wallace Reid was interred in the Azalea Terrace of the Great Mausoleum at Forest Lawn Memorial Park Cemetery in Glendale, California.

Aftermath 
His widow, Dorothy Davenport (billed as Mrs. Wallace Reid), co-produced and appeared in Human Wreckage (1923), making a national tour with the film to publicize the dangers of drug addiction. She and Reid had two children: a son, Wallace Reid Jr., born in 1917; and a daughter, Betty Mummert, whom they adopted in 1922 as a three-year-old. Reid's widow never remarried.

Wallace Reid's contribution to the motion picture industry has been recognized with a star on the Hollywood Walk of Fame.

Popular culture 
In Ken Russell's 1977 film Valentino, Reid is portrayed briefly and inaccurately as a bicycle-riding childish movie star and is made up to look like a cross between the character he played in Clarence, Harold Lloyd, and the comic actors Jimmie Adams and Churchill Ross. In the 1980 documentary Hollywood episode "Single Beds and Double Standards", Reid's story is recalled by those silent film survivors who worked with him: Gloria Swanson, Karl Brown, Henry Hathaway, and stuntman Bob Rose.

In 2007, a biography Wallace Reid: Life and Death of a Hollywood Idol by author E. J. Fleming appeared, the first since his mother's personal recollections after Reid's death.

In 2018, a biography of Reid was the subject of Karina Longworth's Podcast "You Must Remember This".

Filmography 
(see Wallace Reid filmography)

References 

 Notes

 Bibliography
 The First Male Stars: Men of the Silent Era by David W. Menefee. Albany: Bear Manor Media, 2007.
 Col. Selig’s Stories of Movie Life – Wallace Reid. Screenland. Chicago: Screenland Publishing Company, April 1923.
 The Autobiography of Cecil B. DeMille by Cecil B. DeMille. New Jersey: Prentice-Hall, Inc., 1959.
 I Blow My Own Horn by Jesse L. Lasky. New York: Doubleday & Company, Inc., 1957.
 Two Reels and a Crank by Albert E. Smith. New York: Doubleday & Company, Inc., 1952.
 Griffith: The Birth of a Nation Part 1 by Seymour Stern. New York: Film Culture, 1965.
 Swanson on Swanson by Gloria Swanson. New York: Random House, 1980.
 "Wallace Reid Dies in Fight on Drugs" — in The New York Times, January 19, 1923.
 "Wally, the Genial" by Maude S. Cheatham, in Motion Picture magazine. New York: Brewster Publications, Inc., October 1920.

External links 

 
 Literature on Wallace Reid
 portrait of Reid's mother, Berthabelle Westbrook
 Wallace Reid(kino tv)

1891 births
1923 deaths
20th-century American male actors
American male film actors
American male silent film actors
Burials at Forest Lawn Memorial Park (Glendale)
Deaths from influenza
Drug-related deaths in California
Infectious disease deaths in California
Male actors from St. Louis
Paramount Pictures contract players
Vaudeville performers